Konstantin Maznikov (5 April 1905 – 22 October 1967) was a Bulgarian footballer. He competed in the men's tournament at the 1924 Summer Olympics.

Honours
Levski Sofia
 Sofia Championship – 1923, 1924, 1925, 1929
 Ulpia Serdika Cup – 1926, 1930

References

1905 births
1967 deaths
Bulgarian footballers
Bulgaria international footballers
Olympic footballers of Bulgaria
Footballers at the 1924 Summer Olympics
Footballers from Sofia
Association football forwards